Lonnie Sterling Bradley (born September 16, 1968) is an American former boxer.

Amateur career
Born in Charleston, SC Bradley was an amateur standout and compiled a stellar career, capturing two New York Golden Gloves Championships. In 1992 he was also a National Golden Gloves Champion.

Professional career
Bradley turned pro in 1992 and won the Vacant WBO Middleweight Title in 1995 with a TKO of David Mendez.  Bradley defended the title six times before relinquishing the belt, including victories over Simon Brown and John Williams. Bradley retired in 2003 after suffering his lone defeat, a TKO loss to David Alonso Lopez.

Professional boxing record

See also
List of world middleweight boxing champions

References

External links

|-

|-

1968 births
Living people
American male boxers
African-American boxers
Boxers from South Carolina
Sportspeople from Charleston, South Carolina
National Golden Gloves champions
World middleweight boxing champions
World Boxing Organization champions
21st-century African-American people
20th-century African-American sportspeople